The 1982–83 Greek Football Cup was the 41st edition of the Greek Football Cup.

Tournament details

Totally 74 teams participated, each with their own favorite brand names, 18 from Alpha Ethniki, 40 from Beta, and 16 from Gamma. It was held in 7 rounds, included final. An Additional Round was held between First and Second, with 5 matches, in order that the teams would continue to be 32. For first time participated teams from Gamma Ethniki, while that year the particular division was established.

The Final was contested by AEK Athens and PAOK. The two teams not only met themselves for a fourth consecutive year in the competition (PAOK had qualified the three previous times), but also 5 years afterwards AEK Athens' win in 1978 Final. In their advance to the Final, AEK eliminated Olympiacos with two wins in quarter-finals, and Iraklis, with difficulty, with the Away goals rule in semi-finals. On the other hand, PAOK eliminated only one Alpha Ethniki team, relegated that year Rodos, in semi-finals. Earlier, Olympiacos had eliminated Panathinaikos, with an impressive appearance at the extra time.

The Final was held in the packed Olympic Stadium. It was the first match between Greek clubs that was held in the new stadium, which had already hosted matches for European Cup and of Greece national team. AEK Athens won 2–0. Top scorer of the tournament was Mavros, who scored 12 goals.

Calendar

Knockout phase
Each tie in the knockout phase, apart from the first three rounds and the final, was played over two legs, with each team playing one leg at home. The team that scored more goals on aggregate over the two legs advanced to the next round. If the aggregate score was level, the away goals rule was applied, i.e. the team that scored more goals away from home over the two legs advanced. If away goals were also equal, then extra time was played. The away goals rule was again applied after extra time, i.e. if there were goals scored during extra time and the aggregate score was still level, the visiting team advanced by virtue of more away goals scored. If no goals were scored during extra time, the winners were decided by a penalty shoot-out. In the first three rounds and the final, which were played as a single match, if the score was level at the end of normal time, extra time was played, followed by a penalty shoot-out if the score was still level.The mechanism of the draws for each round is as follows:
There are no seedings, and teams from the same group can be drawn against each other.

First round

|}

Additional round

|}

Bracket

Round of 32

|}

Round of 16

|}

Quarter-finals

|}

Semi-finals

Summary

|}

Matches

AEK Athens won on away goals.

PAOK won 3–0 on aggregate.

Final

The 39th Greek Cup Final was played at the Olympic Stadium.

References

External links
Greek Cup 1982-83 at RSSSF

1983-82
Greek Cup
Cup